Greatest Hits is the 1990 video (VHS) containing the greatest hits of The Bangles. The video was also released on DVD in 2005; however, it is the same version with the same quality. The video contains all their music videos from the time they were signed to Columbia Records from 1984 to 1989, except for the video to "Hazy Shade of Winter".

Track listing

External links
 Official site

The Bangles video albums
1990 video albums
1990 compilation albums
Music video compilation albums